Laxton and Moorhouse is a civil parish in the Newark and Sherwood district, within the county of Nottinghamshire, England.

It consists of two settlements:
 A village, Laxton
 A hamlet, Moorhouse.

The parish was previously known as Laxton until 1990 when Moorhouse was included in the title.

Laxton 

Laxton is best known for having the last remaining working open-field system in the United Kingdom. Its name is recorded first in the Domesday Book of 1086 as Laxintone, and may come from Anglo-Saxon Leaxingatūn, meaning the 'farmstead or estate of the people of a man called Leaxa'. It is possibly the namesake of the town of Lexington, Massachusetts, and thus ultimately of all the other towns named Lexington in the United States.

Moorhouse 

This is 2 miles east of Laxton, Predominantly, it is a scattering of farms, farmhouses and cottages amongst a wider rural setting. These are grouped around three roads meeting by a single junction: Green Lane, Moorhouse Lane, and Ossington Lane.

References

External links 
Laxton & Moorhouse Parish Council

Civil parishes in Nottinghamshire
Newark and Sherwood